Young Blades is a 13-episode historical fantasy television series that aired on PAX TV from January to June 2005, inspired by Alexandre Dumas's 1844 novel The Three Musketeers. Thirteen episodes were made before cancellation.

Plot
Set in 17th-century France, the show follows the adventures of four musketeers.

Cast
 d'Artagnan, son of the legendary d'Artagnan in Alexandre Dumas's 1844 novel The Three Musketeers
 Jacqueline, alias Jacques, a woman disguised as a man while on the run for murder
 Siroc, an inventor
 Ramon, a poet

Other main characters include musketeer leader Captain Duval, Queen Anne, Cardinal Mazarin, and a fifteen-year-old Louis XIV. The latter three characters were based on historical figures.

Cast 
Tobias Mehler as d'Artagnan
Karen Cliche as Jacqueline Roget/Jacques Leponte
Mark Hildreth as Siroc
Zak Santiago as Ramon Montalvo Francisco de la Cruz
Bruce Boxleitner as Captain Martin Duvall
Robert Sheehan as King Louis XIV
Michael Ironside as Cardinal Mazarin
Sheena Easton as Queen Anne

Episodes

References

External links 
 

2000s American drama television series
2000s Canadian drama television series
2005 American television series debuts
2005 American television series endings
2005 Canadian television series debuts
2005 Canadian television series endings
American fantasy television series
Canadian fantasy television series
PAX TV original programming
Television shows based on The Three Musketeers
Television series set in the 17th century
Cultural depictions of Louis XIV
Cultural depictions of Cardinal Mazarin
Cultural depictions of Anne, Queen of Great Britain
Cultural depictions of Charles de Batz de Castelmore d'Artagnan